"I Can Do That" is a song from the musical A Chorus Line.

Production
As with the rest of the musical numbers in A Chorus Line, this song was inspired by real-life stories of dancers. CityBeat explains "nervous Mike...tells how he took over his sister’s dance class opportunity".

Critical reception
TheatrePeople described the musical style as "lively jazz swing", while MovieMet called it "an energetic, post-Vaudevillian song-and-dance" and added it "will remind film fans of Donald O’Connor’s “Make ‘em Laugh” routine from “Singin’ in the Rain”". Dance Informa deemed it a "potentially exuberant number", and Stage Whispers described it as "cute". It has also been described as a "high-energy number".

References

Songs from A Chorus Line
1975 songs